Kepler-25 is a star in the northern constellation of Lyra. It is slightly larger and more massive than the sun with a luminosity 2 times that of the sun. With an apparent visual magnitude of 10.6, this star is too faint to be seen with the naked eye.

Planetary system
In 2011, two candidate planets were found transiting this star by the Kepler space telescope. These planets are very close to yet not lie in the 1:2 orbital resonance to each other, indicating the absence of other planetary objects in the inner part of the planetary systems. These planets were confirmed through transit-timing variation method. A third planet was discovered through follow-up radial velocity measurements and was confirmed in January 2014.

The plane of planetary orbits is well aligned with the equatorial plane of the star, misalignment angle equal to 7°

References

 
Lyra (constellation)
F-type main-sequence stars
244
Planetary transit variables
Planetary systems with three confirmed planets
J19063321+3929164